Through the Back Door is a 1921 American silent comedy drama film directed by Alfred E. Green and Jack Pickford, and starring Mary Pickford.

Plot
The movie starts in Belgium in the early 1900s. Jeanne (Mary Pickford) is the 10-year-old daughter of Louise (Gertrude Astor). Troubles start when Louise remarries a selfish but rich man named Elton Reeves (Wilfred Lucas). He convinces her to move to America and leave Jeanne behind in Belgium to live with the maid Marie (Helen Raymond). At first Louise refuses to, but eventually gives in and leaves Jeanne in the care of Marie.

Five years pass and Jeanne and Marie bonded. Meanwhile, Louise hated living in America and feels guilty having left her kid behind. She returns to Belgium to reunite with Jeanne, but Marie does not want to give her up. When Louise finally arrives, Marie lies to her Jeanne drowned in a river nearby. Louise is devastated and collapses, before returning to America. This results in estranging from Elton.

World War I breaks out and Belgium is occupied by Germany. Marie fears for Jeanne's safety and brings her to America to live with her mother. After an emotional goodbye, Jeanne sets out for America to find her mother. Along the way she meets two orphan boys and decides to take care of them. When she finally arrives in America, she travels to Louise's big mansion.

Too afraid to tell her she is her daughter, Jeanne applies to serve as her maid. While pretending to be someone else, she gets to know her mother. However, she has trouble keeping up the lie and wants nothing more but have a reconciliation. Waiting for the right time to tell the truth, Jeanne hopes everything will come to a right end. When guests of the mansion plot to fleece Elton, Jeanne is forced to reveal her true identity to save the day. A happy reunion follows.

Cast
 Mary Pickford as Jeanne
 Gertrude Astor as Louise Reeves
 Wilfred Lucas as Elton Reeves
 Helen Raymond as Marie
 C. Norman Hammond  as Jacques Lanvain
 Elinor Fair as Margaret Brewster
 Adolphe Menjou as James Brewster
 Peaches Jackson as Conrad
 Doreen Turner as Constant
 John Harron as Billy Boy
 George Dromgold as Chauffeur
 Jeanne Carpenter as Jeanne (age 5)

References

External links

1921 films
1921 comedy-drama films
1920s English-language films
American silent feature films
American black-and-white films
United Artists films
Belgium in fiction
Films set in Belgium
Films directed by Alfred E. Green
Articles containing video clips
Films with screenplays by Gerald Duffy
1920s American films
Silent American comedy-drama films